The GP2 Asia Series was a form of open wheel motor racing as a result of a spin-off from the GP2 series.

The series was officially announced during the weekend of the 2007 Monaco Grand Prix. GP2 series organiser Bruno Michel commented that "It is of great importance that the GP2 Asia Series maintains a strong and viable link to Formula One. Our inclusion as the support races on the programme of Asian Grands Prix in 2008 is an essential key in this new venture".

The first season ran during the main GP2 series off season, January–April, with five two-race meetings.  It ran  alongside the new Speedcar Series, and the events in Malaysia and Bahrain acted as support races for the Formula One championship.

In effort to promote motor racing in Asia, each team is encouraged to have at least one driver whose passport does not come from Western Europe or the Americas (North and South). For the avoidance of doubt, Turkey and Russia are not included in the list of "European" countries.

However, in the 2008 season, four of the thirteen teams opted to field two non-Asian drivers with the agreement that one of their two drivers would be a "ghost driver" and receive no prize money for competing in the series.

In 2011, GP2 CEO Bruno Michel announced that the GP2 Asia Series would be merged with the European series after the 2011 season.

Point system
Pole for Saturday races: 2 points

Fastest lap: 1 point in each race. Driver recording fastest lap has to drive 90% of race laps. The driver must also start the race from his allocated grid position and finish in the top ten of the race to be eligible for the fastest lap point. 
With this points system, the most points anyone can score in one round is 20 by claiming pole position, winning both races with the fastest lap in each race.

Champions

See also
 List of GP2 Asia Series drivers
 GP2 Series
 GP3 Series
 Formula One
 Formula 3000
 Formula Three
 Formula Two

References

External links

GP2 Series official website
GP2 Asia Series official website

 
Asia Series
Gp2 Asia Series
Recurring sporting events established in 2008
Recurring events disestablished in 2011